Project Runway Season 17 is the seventeenth season of the television show Project Runway, returning to Bravo for the first time since season 5. The season began on Thursday, March 14, 2019. Sixteen designers compete to become "the next great American designer." This was the first season to feature: Karlie Kloss taking over for Heidi Klum, Brandon Maxwell as Zac Posen's replacement, additional judge and former editor-in-chief of Teen Vogue, Elaine Welteroth, as well as 
returning judge and editor-in-chief of Elle, Nina Garcia. In addition, Season 4 winner Christian Siriano replaced Tim Gunn's role as mentor throughout the competition.

Designers
Source:

Designer Progress

: From episode 9 onward, challenge winners no longer received immunity.
: Despite two designers being marked safe, every designer was given a critique.
: In episode 13, it was revealed that instead of four designers, only three of the designers will be able to show their collection at the Finale.

 The designer won Project Runway Season 17.
 The designer advanced to the Finale.
 The designer won the challenge.
 The designer came in second but did not win the challenge.
 The designer had one of the highest scores for that challenge, but did not win.
 The designer had one of the lowest scores for that challenge, but was not eliminated.
 The designer was in the bottom two, but was not eliminated.
 The designer lost and was eliminated from the competition.

Model Progress

 Male models were used for this challenge.

 New York City civic workers were used as models for this challenge.

 Afa Ah Loo - AL
 Bishme Cromartie - BC
 Cavanagh Baker - CB
 Frankie Lewis - FL
 Garo Sparo - GS
 Hester Sunshine - HS
 Jamall Osterholm - JO
 Kovid Kapoor - KK
 Lela Orr - LO
 Nadine Ralliford - NR
 Rakan Shams Aldeen - RA
 Renee Hill - RH
 Sebastian Gray - SG
 Sonia Kasparian - SK
 Tessa Clark - TC
Venny Etienne - VE

Episodes

Episode 1: First Impressions 
Original airdate: 

Sixteen talented designers from all walks of life arrive in New York City for the ultimate fashion competition. The designers start-off by showcasing their best looks for host Karlie Kloss and judges Nina Garcia, Brandon Maxwell and Elaine Welteroth. Afterwards, the contestants meet their mentor, Christian Siriano. The designers receive their first challenge, to create a look inspired by some of the biggest names in fashion but with an unexpected twist.

 WINNER: Tessa Clark
 ELIMINATED: Cavanagh Baker

Episode 2: The Future is Here
Original airdate: 

This week’s challenge tasks the designers to create a mini-collection that shows a sneak peek into the future of fashion. The designers are split into teams, and their models are transformed with special effects body modifications inspired by Simon Huck’s ‘A. Human’ exhibit.

Designers must work in teams for this challenge:

Final Judging:
 WINNER: Sebastian Grey	
 ELIMINATED: Frankie Lewis

Episode 3: All the Rage
Original airdate: 

The designers are tasked with creating bold head-to-toe looks using a single print. Celebrity stylist Marni Senofonte surprises the designers by lending her expertise in this go-big or go-home challenge.

 Guest Judge: Adam Selman (New York fashion designer)
 WINNER: Hester Sunshine
 ELIMINATED: Nadine Ralliford

Episode 4: Survive in Style
Original airdate: 

The designers are whisked away for a camping trip and challenged to create survival chic looks while embracing the wilderness. Their work room, the accessories wall and the runway itself have all been moved to the woods for this unconventional materials challenge. Celebrity stylist Marni Senofonte returns.

 WINNER: Renee Hill
 ELIMINATED: Afa Ah Loo

Episode 5: High Fashion to High Street
Original airdate: 

The designers visit the studio of trailblazer Dapper Dan, who introduced high fashion to the hip-hop world by creating luxury streetwear. The designers are given one day to create their own takes on the future of streetwear.

 Guest Judge: Brandice Daniel (founder and CEO of Harlem’s Fashion Row)
 WINNER: Bishme Cromartie
 ELIMINATED: Kovid Kapoor

Episode 6: Power Play
Original airdate: 

Three women breaking ground in the video game industry visit the runway, helping the designers understand how clothing for powerful women works in video games. The designers are challenged to create their own female video game protagonists with a functional and stylish look.

 Guest Judge: Robin Hunicke (American video game designer)
 WINNER: Hester Sunshine
 ELIMINATED: Rakan Shams Aldeen

Episode 7: Elegance is the New Black
Original airdate: 

The final ten designers are surprised with an invitation to a Brandon Maxwell photo shoot featuring Karlie Kloss. They must impress Maxwell with their takes on elegance, and are faced with a flash sale challenge.

 WINNER: Jamall Osterholm
 ELIMINATED: Sonia Kasparian

Episode 8: Blame It on Rio
Original airdate: 

Stylist Marni Senofonte challenges the designers to create a mini-collection for actress Morena Baccarin ("Deadpool") to wear on vacation in Rio de Janeiro. Each collection must include three looks: daywear, evening wear, and beach wear.

Designers must work in teams to create cohesive looks that tell a vacation fashion story:

 Guest Judges: Morena Baccarin & Marni Senofonte
 WINNER: Hester Sunshine
 ELIMINATED: Renee Hill

Episode 9: The Stitch is Back
Original airdate: 

The designers are challenged to create over-the-top looks inspired by the movie "Rocketman,", the life story of musician Elton John. Designers receive help from some highly-qualified assistants for this project.

 Guest Judge: Julian Day (costume designer for "Rocketman")
 WINNER: Garo Sparo
 ELIMINATED: Lela Orr

Episode 10: What Do You Care About?
Original airdate: 

The designers dig deep into this challenge to use their skills to bring attention to a social cause they care about. Elaine Welteroth mentors each designer on channeling their creative voice for change. Designers also have to make and model their own printed T-shirts with their social message.

 Guest Judge: Aurora James (founder and creative director of footwear company Brother Vellies)
 WINNER: Bishme Cromartie
 ELIMINATED: Venny Etienne

Episode 11: New York City of Dreams
Original airdate: 

The designers head to Christian Siriano's store and atelier, The Curated NYC, where they meet the women who keep New York City moving: a New York school teacher, and civic workers from the USPS, DSNY, FDNY, NYPD, and NYC Ferry. Each designer is asked to create a custom dream dress for their client.

 Guest Judge: Danielle Brooks (actress and singer)
 WINNER: Sebastian Grey
 ELIMINATED: Jamall Osterholm

Episode 12: The Art of Fashion
Original airdate: 

It's the last challenge to determine which four designers move on to the finale; they must create their biggest and best looks as well as design experimental art installations. Rapper Cardi B attends the art installation event as Christian Siriano's guest and provides feedback to the designers.

After judging, the final four are given five months and $10,000 to create ten looks.

 Guest Judge: Linda Fargo (senior vice president at Bergdorf Goodman)
 WINNER: Garo Sparo
 ELIMINATED: Tessa Clark

Episode 13: One Elle of a Day 
Original airdate: 

The four remaining designers arrive at a new work space to unpack their collections and learn their final challenge. Nina Garcia meets them at the Elle Magazine offices and the designers are sent spiraling when tasked with a surprise eleventh look. In the end, only three of them will move on to compete in the finale.

 Guest Judge: Steven Kolb (President & CEO of CFDA)
FINAL THREE: Garo Sparo, Hester Sunshine,  Sebastian Grey
ELIMINATED: Bishme Cromartie

Episode 14: The Final Runway 
Original airdate: 

The final three designers grapple with all aspects of putting together an amazing runway, from model casting to hair and make up to deciding what outfits will give them the best chance for the win. Pressure is at an all-time high when they find out the guest judge is legendary designer Diane von Fürstenberg.

 Guest Judge: Diane von Fürstenberg
WINNER: Sebastian Grey
ELIMINATED: Hester Sunshine (Runner-Up), Garo Sparo (3rd Place)

References

External links 
 Project Runway Season 17 Official Website
 

Season 17
2019 American television seasons
2018 in fashion